Steve Nieve ( "naïve"; born Stephen John Nason, 21 February 1958) is an English musician and composer. In a career spanning more than 40 years, Nieve has been a member of Elvis Costello's backing bands the Attractions, the Imposters and Madness. He has also experienced success as a prolific session musician, featured on a wide array of other artists' recordings.

In 2003, he was inducted into the Rock and Roll Hall of Fame as a member of Elvis Costello and the Attractions.

Early years
Nieve was born in Bishop's Stortford, England, and attended the Royal College of Music, but dropped out in 1977 to join Costello's backing band the Attractions. Nason received his musical moniker "Nieve" (pronounced "naïve") while on the Attractions' first tour for Stiff Records. It was bestowed by tourmate Ian Dury who had been astonished by Nason's innocent query, "What's a groupie?" Before that, at least briefly, he had been using the stage name "Steve A'dore" (a pun on stevedore).

Career
Nieve played piano, organ and other keyboard instruments on most of Costello's projects over the next ten years, including the albums This Year's Model (1978), Imperial Bedroom (1982) and Blood & Chocolate (1986). On the 1984 Costello album Goodbye Cruel World and its accompanying tour, he was credited as "Maurice Worm." His instrument credit on the album was not for playing keyboards, but for providing "random racket". He wrote some material on The Attractions' Costello-less album, Mad About the Wrong Boy under the name Norman Brain, in collaboration with his then girlfriend, Fay Hart. (He also wrote other songs on the album as Steve Nieve.)

In the mid-1980s, Costello began to work less frequently with the Attractions and stopped working with them entirely between 1987 and 1993. During this period, Nieve focused on session work for other artists (the Neville Brothers, Hothouse Flowers, Graham Parker, Squeeze, Tim Finn, Kirsty MacColl, Madness, Nick Heyward and David Bowie). Also in 1986, Nieve formed the group the Perils of Plastic with ex-Deaf School vocalist Steve Allen, releasing three non-charting singles in the UK in 1986 and 1987.  Around the same time, he led the house band (billed as Steve Nieve and The Playboys) on the UK TV series The Last Resort with Jonathan Ross.

Costello reunited the Attractions for 1994's album Brutal Youth. Although the reunion was relatively short-lived (they split again in 1996), the Costello/Nieve collaborations never stopped. They have toured as a duo, and Nieve has contributed keyboards to all of Costello's albums since the mid-1990s, including 1998's Burt Bacharach collaboration Painted From Memory, 2001's Anne Sofie von Otter collaboration For the Stars and 2003's North.

In 2001 Costello formed a new backing band consisting of Nieve, Attractions drummer Pete Thomas, and bassist Davey Faragher. The band was subsequently dubbed the Imposters. Elvis Costello & the Imposters have toured extensively and released the albums When I Was Cruel (2002), North (2003), The Delivery Man (2004), The River in Reverse (2006) with Allen Toussaint, Momofuku (2008), National Ransom (2010), Look Now (2018) and The Boy Named If (2022). In 2020 Nieve won a Grammy for his work with Elvis Costello and the Imposters on Look Now.  Nieve (sans Imposters) accompanied Elvis Costello again on Hey Clockface (2020).

Solo career
In addition to his work with Costello, Nieve has released several solo albums. Keyboard Jungle (1983) was his first, a combination of classical and ersatz film scores delivered from his beloved Steinway piano. His second album, Playboy (1987), consisted of solo acoustic piano renditions of rock songs by David Bowie, 10cc, the Specials, X and others, as well as original compositions. Though both albums were released only in the UK by the independent label Demon Music Group, they were critically well received and noted for their "display [of] the artist's wit, compositional talent and abundant instrumental agility."

Nieve followed these with the albums It's Raining Somewhere (1996), Mumu (2001) and Windows (2004). His classical opera, Welcome to the Voice, a collaboration with Muriel Téodori, was released on Deutsche Grammophon in May 2007. The score was interpreted by Barbara Bonney, Sting, Robert Wyatt, Elvis Costello, Amanda Roocroft, Nathalie Manfrino and Sara Fulgoni for the voices. For the music the Brodsky Quartet interpreted a written score, while Marc Ribot, Ned Rothenberg and Nieve improvised. Nieve also composed the score to Téodori's film Sans Plomb.

In 2008 Welcome to the Voice  was premiered at the Theatre du Châtelet Paris with Sting, Elvis Costello, and Sylvia Schwartz in the role of Lily. 
In 2014, he released ToGetHer.

Personal life
In recent years, Nieve has lived in France with his wife Muriel Téodori.

References

External links
 
 Official website
 
 
 Steve Nieve and The Love Band performing on Tonight with Jonathan Ross

1958 births
Living people
Elvis Costello & the Attractions members
English rock keyboardists
English session musicians
Alumni of the Royal College of Music
Musicians from London
English punk rock musicians
English new wave musicians
Alternative rock keyboardists
British alternative rock musicians
Power pop musicians
British pop rock musicians
British post-punk musicians
English classical musicians
English film score composers
English male film score composers